Yunnan is a sub located in the town of Jurong West in the West Region of Singapore.

Politics
The West portion of the subzone is referred to as Nanyang (part of West Coast GRC under Nanyang  constituency).
The East portion of the subzone is referred to as Gek Poh (part of West Coast GRC under Ayer Rajah-Gek Poh constituency).
Prior to the 2020 elections, both constituencies and the HDB estates in them were managed by Chua Chu Kang Town Council.
The South portion of the subzone is referred to as Pioneer (part of Pioneer constituency).
Since July 2020, the estate (986A–990C) in this constituency, along with both Nanyang and Gek Poh, are managed by West Coast Town Council.

Security
The Jurong Police Division Headquarters is located at the junction of Avenue 5 and Jalan Bahar. It also houses the Nanyang Neighbourhood Police Centre as well.

Education
There are 6 education institutions in this subzone. Including Nanyang Technological University.
Other educational institutions include:
Juying Secondary School
Xingnan Primary School
West Grove Primary School
Pioneer Primary School
Westwood Primary School

Recreation
The Jurong West Sports and Recreation Centre is located at the south portion of the subzone, along Street 93 and Pioneer Road North whereas there are 2 parks in this subzone; Yunnan Park at Street 93 and Jurong West Park at Street 81.

Community clubs
There are 2 community clubs in this subzone. 
Nanyang Community Club is at the junction of Street 91 and Pioneer Road North.
Gek Poh Vile Community Club is at the junction of Street 75 and 74.

Commercial areas
There are 2 commercial areas in this subzone, at Street 91 and at Gek Poh Shopping Centre (along Street 75) whereas both areas each feature a supermarket managed by Prime Group International.

Places of worship
Jin Fu Gong Temple (正华村金福宫) is at Jurong West Street 92.
City Harvest Church is at the junction of Jurong West Street 91 and Pioneer Road North.
Victory Family Centre is at Jurong West Street 74.

Transportation

Road
There are 4 main roads in this subzone, Jalan Bahar, Jurong West Avenue 4/2, Pioneer Road North and Upper Jurong Road/Boon Lay Way. These main roads branch out to several minor roads (Streets and Avenues) in the subzone.

Public transport
Feeder services connect the subzone's neighborhoods to Boon Lay and Pioneer MRT stations, and several trunk services also run through the area.

Neighbouring areas

References

External links

Chua Chu Kang Town Council
Blocks 959 - 966 Jurong West Street 92 on HDB Infoweb
Neighbourhood Complex : Block 762 Jurong West Street 75 on HDB Infoweb
Nanyang Constituency Website
Gek Poh Ville Website

 

Places in Singapore
 Yunnan